Lukas Petkov (born 1 November 2000) is a German professional footballer who plays as a forward for German  club Greuther Fürth, on loan from FC Augsburg.

Club career
On 22 May 2021, Petkov made his Bundesliga debut for FC Augsburg in a 5–2 defeat against Bayern Munich. On 2 June he signed a new contract with Augsburg until June 2024, and was then sent for a season long loan to 3. Liga team SC Verl. On 31 January 2023 Augsburg extended Petkov's contract until the summer of 2026 and send him on loan to 2. Bundesliga team Greuther Fürth until the end of season.

International career
Born in Germany, Petkov is of Bulgarian descent. In January 2022 Aleksandar Dimitrov, the manager of Bulgaria U21, confirmed that Petkov expressed his desire to represent Bulgaria and it's subject of gaining citizenship.  In January 2023 Bulgarian Football Union confirmed Petkov agreed to play for Bulgaria and they are working on making him available to debut in 2023.

Career statistics

Club

References

External links
 
 
 
 

2000 births
German people of Bulgarian descent
People from Aichach-Friedberg
Sportspeople from Swabia (Bavaria)
Footballers from Bavaria
Living people
German footballers
Association football forwards
FC Augsburg II players
FC Augsburg players
SC Verl players
SpVgg Greuther Fürth players
Bundesliga players
3. Liga players
Regionalliga players